The Board of Intermediate and Secondary Education is the intermediate education control government body in Sahiwal Division. Its head-office is located in Sahiwal.

History 
The BISE was established on June 15, 2012 by the Higher Education Department (HED) of the Punjab. Before its establishment Sahiwal and Pakpattan were facilitating by the BISE Multan. Okara District was being facilitated by the BISE Lahore.

Mission 
Board of Intermediate and Secondary Education Sahiwal has the command to enhance and keep up more elevated amount of education being conferred in the legislature and private instructive establishments found in the areas of Okara, Vehari and Sahiwal. BISE Sahiwal Board is additionally capable to direct the yearly exams of Matric and Intermediate classes in science and expressions bunches. Sahiwal Board begins getting the confirmation structures from the hopefuls and gets ready BISE Sahiwal date sheets alongside SSC Roll number slips of the understudies. BISE Sahiwal Matric section 1 date sheet and SSC section 2 date sheet are issued to the understudies amid the second week of February and the Inter section 1 yearly exams and HSSC section 2 yearly exams are directed amid the month of March.

Managing Body 
The following shall be the officers of a Board:

 Chairman
 Secretary
 Controller of Examination 
 Chief Secrecy Officer
 Officer Confidential

Branches 
The secretary controls the following branches:

 Admin Branch 
 Finance Branch
 Audit Branch
 Registration Branch
 Vehicle Branch
 Meeting Branch
 Litigation Branch
 Academic Branch
 One Window Operation
 Verification Branch
 Store Branch

The Controller of Examination controls the following branches:

 Matric Branch
 Inter Branch
 Conduct Branch
 Secrecy Branch
 Discipline Branch
 Computer Section
 Embossing Cell

Jurisdiction 
Jurisdiction of Sahiwal board include the following districts.
 Okara District
 Sahiwal District
 Vehari District

Sahiwal board Results 
Board of Intermediate and Secondary Education Sahiwal (BISE Sahiwal) mostly holds annual exams in March and April andBISE Sahiwal in the month of August, after the 2–3 months of examinations. All the students who belongs to Sahiwal Board, have to equal opportunity to check their result via Gazette which publishes by Board, or they also can check their result online via Sahiwal Board Official Website at BISE Sahiwal.

See also 
 List of educational boards in Pakistan
 Federal Board of Intermediate and Secondary Education

References

External links 
 
 BISE Sahiwal Board 10th Class Date Sheet 2023(unofficial)
 9th Class Date Sheet of BISE Sahiwal Board 2023

Sahiwal